George Newport FRS (4 February 1803, Canterbury – 7 April 1854, London) was a prominent English entomologist. He is especially noted for his studies utilizing the microscope and his skills in dissection.

Biography
He was the first of four children of William Newport (1777-1843), a local wheelwright, and Sarah Gillham. He was educated at London University and at the College of Surgeons. He was President of the Entomological Society of London (1843–1844) and also a member of the Ray Society. Newport was awarded with the Royal Medal 1836 and with the Royal Society Bakerian Medal 1841. He is buried in Kensal Green Cemetery, London.

Works
He was one of the most skilled anatomists of his time, and his researches on the structure of insects and other arthropods are notable. His publications include:
 On the Respiration of Insects (1836)
 “Insecta,” in Todd's Cyclopædia of Anatomy and Physiology (1839)
 On the Use of Antennæ of Insects (1840)
 List of Specimens of Myriopoda in the British Museum (1844)
 Monograph of the Class Myriopoda, Order Chilopoda (1845)
 On the Impregnation of the Ovum in the Amphibia (1851)

Newport wrote on the structure, relations, and development of the nervous and circulatory systems, and on the existence of a complete circulation of the blood in vessels, in Myriapoda and macrourous Arachnida in the Philosophical Transactions of the Royal Society of London First series. 1843: 243-302; see p. 270.
He published researches on the impregnation of the ovum in the Amphibia; and on the early stages of development of the embryo. Phil. Trans. R. Soc 144, 229-244. (1854) Newport wrote on the Organs of Reproduction, and the Development of the Myriopoda in Phil. Trans. R. Soc. And he wrote on the Nervous System of the Sphinx ligustri, Linn., (Part II) During the Latter Stages of its Pupa and its Imago State, and on the Means by Which its Development is Affected Phil. Trans. R. Soc.

References

English entomologists
Myriapodologists
1803 births
1854 deaths
Fellows of the Royal Society
Royal Medal winners
People from Canterbury
19th-century British zoologists
Alumni of the University of London
Presidents of the Royal Entomological Society